Kobułty  is a village in the administrative district of Gmina Biskupiec, within Olsztyn County, Warmian-Masurian Voivodeship, in northern Poland.
The village has a population of 520.

References

Villages in Olsztyn County